The Terek Soviet Republic (Терская Советская Республика), or Terek People's Republic (Терская Народная Республика) (March 1918 – February 1919), was a short-lived republic on the territory of the former Terek Oblast. Its capital was first Pyatigorsk, and later Vladikavkaz. After July 1918, it was part of the North Caucasian Soviet Republic.

In contrast to other Soviet republics, the Republic was a coalition government.

The famous economist Jacob Marschak served as Secretary of Labour, despite being only a 19-year-old student.

After internal struggles, it was conquered by the Volunteer Army led by Anton Denikin in early 1919.

References

Subdivisions of the Russian Soviet Federative Socialist Republic
Early Soviet republics
States and territories established in 1918
States and territories disestablished in 1919
Former socialist republics
Post–Russian Empire states